Mater Maria Catholic College is an independent Roman Catholic co-educational secondary day school, located in Warriewood, on the Northern Beaches of Sydney, New South Wales, Australia. It was established in 1962 by the Sisters of the Good Samaritan and is located in the Roman Catholic Diocese of Broken Bay.

History 
In January 1962, Sisters of the Good Samaritan founded a secondary school for thirty-eight Catholic girls at Narrabeen. In 1964 the college moved to Forest Road at Warriewood. The school's immediate priority was to educate the girls in a peaceful environment. By 1979, the local population growth and demand led to the decision to expand and establish the college as co-educational. In 1984, students sat for the Higher School Certificate for the first time at the College. The majority of these students had been the pioneers of co-education at the college in 1979 and had become the founding members of the new senior school.

Over the next decades, new facilities were built concurrent with developments in curriculum and increasing enrolment. Contributions from the Commonwealth and the five feeder parishes financed five new buildings that were opened in the period from 1974 to 1990 and the Sisters donated the land to the College in perpetuity in 1980. In 1990 the first Lay Principal was appointed. During  the  1990s  significant changes were made in management, pastoral care and the curriculum. In 2002, the Bush `bush' Chapel was closed and decommissioned in preparation for the largest integral expansion at the College.

John Ducker, the former president of the Australian Labor Party, the  Australian Council of Trade Unions, and a member of the NSW Legislative Council, was the first chairperson of the Parent's Board. One of the school buildings is named after Ducker.

Notable alumni 

 James Dargaville rugby union footballer
 Danielle Macdonald (actress)

See also 

 List of Catholic schools in New South Wales
 Catholic education in Australia

References 

Catholic secondary schools in Sydney
Private schools Northern Beaches Sydney
Roman Catholic Diocese of Broken Bay
Educational institutions established in 1962
1962 establishments in Australia